Bebearia makala is a butterfly in the family Nymphalidae. It is found in Cameroon, the Democratic Republic of the Congo and the Central African Republic.

Subspecies
Bebearia makala makala (northern and eastern Democratic Republic of the Congo, Central African Republic)
Bebearia makala bosmansi Hecq, 1989 (Cameroon)

References

Butterflies described in 1908
makala